"It's For You, North Dakota U" (or North Dakota U) is a fight song of the University of North Dakota in Grand Forks, North Dakota. The song was composed by Franz Rickaby in 1921.

Lyrics

Notes

External links
"It's for You, North Dakota U" - und.edu

University of North Dakota
American college songs
College fight songs in the United States
Big Sky Conference fight songs
1921 songs
Songs about North Dakota